Anabel Shaw (born Marjorie Henshaw; June 24, 1921 – April 16, 2010) was an American film actress. Active during the 1940s and 1950s in a mixture of lead and supporting roles, she then made a few appearances on television.

Biography
Shaw was born Marjorie Henshaw on June 7, 1921, and was billed by that name when she made Here Come the Waves for Warner Bros. She graduated from the University of California.

Shaw married Joseph Ford, a professor of sociology. They had three children, archaeologist Anabel Ford, daughter CeCe, and son Steve. They later divorced in 1986. She later married George Scopececk.

Shaw died of breast cancer on April 16, 2010, aged 88. Her body was given to the UCLA Donated Body Program.

Filmography

References

Bibliography
 Keaney, Michael F. Film Noir Guide: 745 Films of the Classic Era, 1940-1959. McFarland, 2003.

External links

American film actresses
People from Oakland, California
20th-century American actresses
1921 births
2010 deaths
Actresses from California
University of California alumni